Ifeanyi Kalu  is a Nigerian television and film actor, model and fashion designer. He is best known for his role in the movie Lagos Cougars where he starred alongside Uche Jombo, Monalisa Chinda, Alexx Ekubo and the Africa Independent Television (AIT) series Allison's Stand alongside Joselyn Dumas, Bimbo Manuel, and Victor Olaotun.

Early life
Kalu was born in Surulere, a suburb in Lagos State, southwestern Nigeria. Kalu is of Igbo heritage from Imo State in the eastern part of Nigeria. He studied Computer science in the University.

Personal life 
Kalu married filmmaker Nicolette Ndigwe in 2021.

Career
Kalu began his career as a model, appearing in television and billboard commercials. In 2011, he enrolled in the Royal Arts Academy to study acting. His breakout screen role was in 2012, when he was cast in the role of Usen in the movie Kokomma produced by Uduak Isong Oguamanam and directed by Tom Robson. The movie received 3 nominations at the 9th Africa Movie Academy Awards.

In 2014, his roles in the movies Lagos Cougars and Perfect Union earned him a City People Awards nomination for Most Promising Actor, an award he was again nominated for in 2017. In 2019 he received another nomination from City People Awards for Best Supporting Actor, and in the same year, he was nominated for and won the Best Supporting Actor award at the United Kingdom based Zulu African Film Academy Awards (ZAFAA), for his role in the movie Kuvana, where he starred alongside Wale Ojo, Sambasa Nzeribe and Ivie Okujaiye.

In 2019, Kalu launched a "ready-to-wear" fashion line tagged Ifeanyi Kalu.

Filmography

Selected movie roles

Television roles

Awards

References 

Nigerian male film actors
Nigerian male television actors
1988 births
Living people
Igbo male actors
Igbo male models
Actors from Imo State
Nigerian male models
Nigerian fashion designers
21st-century Nigerian male actors
Nigerian film award winners